The Thomasites were a group of 600 American teachers who traveled from the United States to the newly occupied territory of the Philippines on the U.S. Army Transport Thomas. The group included 346 men and 180 women, hailing from 43 different states and 193 colleges, universities, and normal schools. The term 'Thomasites' has since expanded to include any teacher who arrived in the first few years of the American colonial period of the Philippines.

Thomas carried nearly 500 Thomasites, who arrived in Manila in August 1901. They represented 192 institutions, including Harvard (19), Yale (15), Cornell (13), University of Chicago (8), University of Michigan (24), University of California (25), Albion College (1), Alma College (2), Kalamazoo College (1), the Michigan State Normal School at Ypsilanti (now Eastern Michigan University) (6), and Olivet College (3).

Foundation, purpose and etymology
The Thomasites arrived in the Philippines on August 21, 1901, to establish a new public school system, to teach basic education, and to train Filipino teachers, with English as the medium of instruction. Adeline Knapp, Thomasite and author of The Story of the Philippines, said:

Philippines had enjoyed a public school system since 1863, when a Spanish decree first introduced public elementary education in the Philippines. The Thomasites, however, expanded and improved the public school system and switched to English as the medium of instruction.

The name Thomasite was derived from the United States Army Transport Thomas which brought the educators to the shores of Manila Bay.  Although two groups of new American graduates arrived in the Philippines before Thomas, the name Thomasite became the designation of all pioneer American teachers simply because Thomas had the largest contingent.  Later batches of American teachers were also dubbed Thomasites.

The Thomasites—365 males and 165 females—left Pier 12 of San Francisco on July 23, 1901, to sail via the Pacific Ocean to South East Asia.  The U.S. government spent about $105,000 for the expedition. More American teachers followed the Thomasites in 1902, making a total of about 1,074 stationed in the Philippines.</ref> On January 20, 1901, Act No. 74 formalized the creation of the department.

At the time, the Thomasites were offered $125 a month, but once in the Philippines salaries were often delayed and were usually paid in devalued Mexican pesos.

Although the Thomasites were the largest group of pioneers with the purpose of educating the Filipinos, they were not the first to be deployed by Washington, D.C.  A few weeks before the arrival of Thomas, U.S. Army soldiers had already begun teaching Filipinos the English language, thus in effect laying the foundation of the Philippine public school system.  The U.S. Army opened the Philippines' first public school in Corregidor Island, after Admiral George Dewey vanquished the Spanish Pacific fleet in Manila Bay on May 1, 1898.  Also, a few weeks before the arrival of Thomas, another group composed of 48 American teachers also arrived in the Philippines, aboard the USAT Sheridan.

After President William McKinley's appointment of William Howard Taft as the head of a commission that would be responsible for continuing the educational work started by the U.S. Army, the Taft Commission passed Education Act No. 74 on January 21, 1901, which established the Department of Public Instruction.  The latter was then given the task of establishing a public school system throughout the Philippines. The Taft Commission also authorized the further deployment of 1,000 more educators from the U.S. to the Philippines.

Assignments

After being quarantined for two days after their arrival on August 21, 1901, the Thomasites were finally able to disembark from the Thomas.  They traveled from the customs house near the Anda Circle then stayed at the walled city Intramuros, Manila before being given initial provincial assignments which included Albay, Catanduanes, Camarines Norte, Camarines Sur, Sorsogon, Masbate, Samar, Zambales, Aparri, Jolo, Negros, Cebu, Dumaguete, Bulacan, Bataan, Batangas, Pangasinan and Tarlac.

Curriculum 1902–1935
The Thomasites taught the following subjects: English, agriculture, reading, grammar, geography, mathematics, general courses, trade courses, housekeeping and household arts (sewing, crocheting and cooking), manual trading, mechanical drawing, freehand drawing and athletics (baseball, track and field, tennis, indoor baseball and basketball).

Legacy
The Thomasites built upon the Spanish school system created in 1863 and the contributions laid down by the U.S. Army.  They built elementary schools and learning institutions such as the Philippine Normal School, formerly the Escuela Normal de Maestros during the Spanish period (now Philippine Normal University) and the Philippine School of Arts and Trades, formerly the Escuela Central de Artes y Oficios de Manila (now Technological University of the Philippines) in 1901, the Tarlac High School on September 21, 1902, and the Tayabas High School (now Quezon National High School), on October 2, 1902.

The Thomasites also reopened the Philippine Nautical School, which was originally established by the Board of Commerce of Manila in 1839  under Spain.  About a hundred of the Thomasites stayed on to live in the Philippines after finishing their teaching assignments.  They transformed the Philippines into the third largest English-speaking nation in the world and became the precursors of the present-day U.S. Peace Corps Volunteers.

For their contribution to Philippine education, the Thomasites Centennial Project was established in cooperation with American Studies associations in the Philippines, the Philippine-American Educational Foundation, the Embassy of the United States of America in Manila, and other leading cultural and educational institutions in the Philippines.

The municipality of New Washington, Aklan was named after U.S. President George Washington as a tribute to the Thomasites.

List of some Thomasite teachers
Edwin Copeland, first dean of UP College of Agriculture and founder of the University of the Philippines at Los Baños.
Austin Craig, an American expert on José Rizal
A.V.H. Hartendorp, the founder and publisher of the Philippine Magazine
Adeline Knapp
Henry Nash, former member of Theodore Roosevelt's Rough Riders
Philinda Rand
Dr. Horace Brinsmade Silliman, founder of Silliman University
Frank Russell White, founder of Tarlac Provincial High School (now Tarlac National High School), the oldest public high school in the Philippines
Carter G. Woodson, African-American historian
Marius John, author of the "Philippine Saga" (1940) who was stationed at Baao, Camarines Sur in 1902

See also
History of the Philippines
Philippine English
John Stuart Thomson

References

External links
The Log of the "Thomas" (archived from the original on 2001-10-03).

American expatriates in the Philippines
Education in the Philippines
1901 establishments in the Philippines
1901 in the Philippines
History of the Philippines (1898–1946)